Ghost Ghirls is a scripted comedy web series produced by Jack Black, following the antics of two best friends, Heidi and Angelica, who work as paranormal investigators. Each episode details the humorous adventures of the bumbling duo as they attempt to solve otherworldly cases while not tripping over themselves in the process. The show was created, written, produced and starred in by Maria Blasucci and Amanda Lund. Jeremy Konner co-created, co-wrote and directed all episodes.

The show premiered all 12 episodes on Yahoo! Screen on September 8, 2013.

Cast and characters

Main

Guest

 Jack Black
 Molly Shannon
 Val Kilmer
 Dave Grohl
 Jake Johnson
 Jason Ritter
 Molly Hawkey
 Kate Micucci
 Jillian Rose Reed
 Sugar Lyn Beard
 Brett Gelman
 Colin Hanks
 Jay Hernandez
 Natasha Leggero
 Bob Odenkirk
 Jason Schwartzman

See also
List of original programs distributed by Yahoo! Screen

References

American comedy web series
English-language television shows
2010s American comedy television series
2013 American television series debuts
2010s American supernatural television series